Andaket, Aandqet,  is a Maronite Christian village in Akkar Governorate, Lebanon.

History
In 1838, Eli Smith noted  'Andakid  as a Maronite village, located east of esh-Sheikh Muhammed.

References

Bibliography

External links
Aandqet, Localiban

Populated places in Akkar District
Maronite Christian communities in Lebanon